Rāstā is a 2003 Indian Bengali-language crime thriller film written and directed by Bratya Basu. It is a revenge drama, consisting of crimes in the roads of Kolkata, related to drug syndicate supported by a corrupt politician.

Plot

A fast-paced thriller, with Mithun providing the twist as a corrupted politician.

Cast
Mithun Chakraborty as a corrupt minister Jagannath Halder
Rajatava Dutta as Santosh Banerjee alias Bhai Da
Amitabh Bhattacharjee as Neel Sengupta
Raghuvir Yadav as Neel's friend Taal Da
Rimjhim Gupta as Neel's love interest
Debshankar Haldar as ACP Debashish Sinha
Anamitra Saha as Bhai Da's son
Dolon Roy
Manasi Sinha
Alakananda Ray
Soma Dey
Alaka Gangopadhyay
Supriyo Dutta as Bhai Da's henchman

References

External links
 

2003 films
2000s Bengali-language films
Bengali-language Indian films
Mithun's Dream Factory films
2003 thriller drama films
Films shot in Ooty
Indian thriller drama films
Indian crime drama films
2003 crime drama films 
Films directed by Bratya Basu